Alexander Ivanovich Tselikov (20 April 1904, in Moscow – 28 October 1984, in Moscow) was a Soviet metallurgist, industrial machines designer, and Hero of Socialist Labor (1964, 1984). He was elected a corresponding member of the Academy of Sciences of the USSR in 1953 and full member (academician) in 1964.

1904 births
1984 deaths
Heroes of Socialist Labour
Full Members of the USSR Academy of Sciences
Engineers from Moscow
Soviet metallurgists